Richard Sahagún Rodríguez (born July 31, 1982, Bilbao, Spain) is a Spanish actor and stage and film director.

Life and career 

He studied, trained and graduated in theatre, drama and acting (BA) in Artebi School of Dramatic Art (predecessor of the current Ánima Eskola School of Drama) with Marina Shimanskaya and Algis Arlauskas, training as a method actor, under the Stanislavsky-M.Chekhov-Grotowski-Vakhtangov methodology (Russian method), following the methodologies of the Russian classical school.

He has worked in different theatrical productions in different theaters. In february 2010 he created the "Vagón de 4ª" theater company together with David Valdelvira. In 2014 he was appointed artistic director of the Hacería theater in Bilbao. In this context, he created the "Hacería Theater Company", with actresses and actors from the Scenic and Theatrical Research Laboratories of the Hacería theater.

As a film and television actor he has worked in more than 25 film and television productions.

As a theater director, he has produced several great theatrical productions, in theaters such as the Teatro Arraiga, such as an adaptation of Kafka's The Metamorphosis, Horse / Dostoevsky or King Lear.

Filmography

Television 

 2020, Patria, HBO Spain
 2019, La que se avecina, Telecinco
 2015–2016, El ministerio del tiempo, La 1
 2014–present, Fantasmagórica
 2012, El secreto de Puente Viejo, Antena 3
 2012, Hispania, la leyenda, Antena 3
 2012, Águila Roja, TVE
 2009, Mi gemela es hija única, Telecinco
 2008, El comisario, Telecinco
 2007, Yo soy Bea

Film 

 2022, Red Summer
 2019, El silencio de la ciudad blanca
 2018, 70 binladens
 2017, El guardián invisible
 2016, Gernika
 2015, Teresa
 2014, Neuroworld
 2014, Por un puñado de besos
 2011, No habrá paz para los malvados

Stage 

 2022, King Lear, stage production at the Teatro Arriaga
 2021, Kakerlake/Kafka, stage production at the Teatro Arriaga
 2019/2021, Horse/Dostoevsky, stage production at the Teatro Arriaga
 2017, Crystal Summer
 2016, Influence of endrin in summer
 2015, The Embrace of Herontidae
 2014, The sadness of the snail
 2010, The Dog Owner of Man
 2009, The Golden Man
 2008–09, The Fable of the Dead Princess, "Vagón de 4ª" theater company production

References

External links 

 

1982 births
Living people
People from Bilbao
Ánima Eskola School of Drama alumni
21st-century Spanish actors
Spanish film actors
Spanish television actors
Spanish stage actors